The Jāmeh Mosque of Zanjān ( – Masjid-e-Jāmeh Zanjān) also known as, Seyyed Mosque (Masjid-e-Seyyed) and Sultani Mosque, is the grand, congregational mosque (Jāmeh) of Zanjān city, Iran. The mosque is situated in the old part of the city and was constructed in 1826 during the Qajar era. The construction was carried out by Abdollah Mirza who was one of the children of Fat'h 'Alī Shāh Qājār.

Specifications
The mosque contains four iwans on the sides of a large open court. To the east and west of the court sixteen chambers exist running parallel to each other. Facing towards south are more chambers used as residential quarters for theology students. These chambers have vaulted and arched ceilings decorated with artistic tile work. The mosque has four Shabestans, or night prayer halls, each containing a minbar.

See also
Holiest sites in Islam

References

External links

Mosques in Iran
Buildings and structures in Zanjan Province
Tourist attractions in Zanjan Province
Religious buildings and structures completed in 1826
Mosque buildings with domes
National works of Iran
Zanjan
Buildings of the Qajar period